William Bowie (31 December 1869 – 9 June 1934) was a Scottish footballer who played for Linthouse, Clyde and Scotland. He was the only serving Linthouse player to have been selected for international duty.

References

Sources

External links

London Hearts profile

1869 births
1934 deaths
Scottish footballers
Scotland international footballers
Linthouse F.C. players
Clyde F.C. players
People from Govan
Footballers from Glasgow
Association football inside forwards